Charles Tottenham may refer to:
 Charles Tottenham (1685–1758), Irish Member of Parliament for New Ross
 Charles Tottenham (1716–1795), Irish MP for Fethard, New Ross, Bannow and Clonmines
 Charles Tottenham (1738–1806), MP for Fethard and Wexford; later Charles Loftus, 1st Marquess of Ely
 Charles Tottenham (1743–1823), MP for New Ross
 Charles Tottenham (1768–1843), MP for New Ross
 Charles Tottenham (1807–1886), MP for New Ross
 Charles George Tottenham (1835–1918), MP for New Ross